The Novgorod uprising of 1650 was an uprising in Novgorod, caused by the Russian government's bulk purchasing of grain (traded to Sweden) and the resulting increases in the price of bread.

In mid-March 1650, the revolting craftsmen, some of the Streltsy, and urban poor deposed voyevoda Fyodor Khilkov and ravaged the households of several merchants around Novgorod. The insurgents elected a number of city elders and put a metropolitan clerk named Ivan Zheglov in charge of municipal government. On March 17, Metropolitan Nikon of Novgorod anathemized the new municipal authority from a church ambon, for which he would be beaten up by the crowd on March 19. Tsar Alexei Mikhailovich dispatched a noble named Solovtsov to settle the conflict, but the latter was arrested on the spot and kept under guard for several days. The insurgents attempted to establish contact with rebellious Pskov (see Pskov Uprising of 1650), but to no avail. Eventually, the internal struggle for power between the urban poor and well-off citizens, Ivan Zheglov's hesitation and inconsistency, and Metropolitan Nikon's firm stance led to the insurgents' defeat. The government troops under the command of Prince Ivan Nikitich Khovansky approached Novgorod in early April and, after having spent a few days at the city walls, entered the city on April 13 meeting no resistance.

The leaders of the uprising were arrested, five of whom would soon be executed. Over a hundred people were flogged and exiled to the Russian North, Astrakhan, and Terek.

See also
 List of food riots

References

Riots and civil disorder in Russia
History of Veliky Novgorod
Food riots
1650 riots
1650 in Russia